The 14th Biathlon World Championships held in 1976 in Antholz-Anterselva, Italy were only for the 10 km sprint because this event was not part of the Olympic programme in Innsbruck.

Men's results

10 km sprint

Medal table

References

1976
Biathlon World Championships
International sports competitions hosted by Italy
1976 in Italian sport
Biathlon competitions in Italy
January 1976 sports events in Europe
Sport in South Tyrol